Cayman Airways is the flag carrier airline of the British Overseas Territory of the Cayman Islands. With its head office in Grand Cayman, it operates mainly as an international and domestic scheduled passenger carrier, with cargo services available on most routes. Its operations are based at Owen Roberts International Airport in George Town, Grand Cayman. The company slogan is Those who fly us love us.

History

Early history: 1968 – 1975

The airline was established and started operations on 7 August 1968. It was formed following the Cayman Islands Government's purchase of 51% of Cayman Brac Airways which had been founded in 1955, from LACSA, the Costa Rican flag carrier, and became wholly government-owned in December 1977. LACSA had been serving Grand Cayman since the mid-1950s as an intermediate stop on its route between San José, Costa Rica, and Miami with some flights also making a stop in Havana, Cuba, as well between Grand Cayman and Miami. In 1965, Cayman Brac Airways (which was also known as CBA Airways Ltd.) was operating regional services from Owen Roberts International Airport in George Town, Grand Cayman, to Gerrard Smith International Airport on Cayman Brac as well as to Little Cayman via a flag stop and also to Montego Bay, Jamaica. A weekly service with a twin-engine Beechcraft 18 aircraft was being operated on a routing of Grand Cayman – Little Cayman (flag stop only) – Cayman Brac – Montego Bay with an additional weekly service being flown between Grand Cayman and Cayman Brac with an intermediate stop on occasion at Little Cayman as a flag stop. Connecting services for Grand Cayman were available to LACSA flights for services to Miami and also for Pan Am flights at Montego Bay for connecting service to Miami and New York City.

Early on, Cayman Airways first aircraft was a single Douglas DC-3. A few months after it was formed, the airline flew its first international route to Kingston, Jamaica, operating five times a week using a BAC One-Eleven twin jet wet-leased from LACSA. International services to Miami were operated eight times a week using a single leased Douglas DC-6 propliner. By the winter of 1973, Cayman Airways was operating stretched BAC One-Eleven series 500 aircraft on both of its jet routes with seventeen flights a week between Grand Cayman and Miami as well as five flights a week between Grand Cayman and Kingston. The airline was also offering direct connecting jet service between Miami and Kingston via Grand Cayman at this time.

Expansion: 1976 – 1989
In 1976, the airline had increased competition on the Grand Cayman - Miami route as Southern Airways and LACSA were both operating nonstop jet service on the route. By the late 1970s, Cayman Airways had commenced its second nonstop route to the United States with service between Grand Cayman and Houston George Bush Intercontinental Airport operated with a BAC One-Eleven series 500.

In 1979, an additional BAC One-Eleven jet, as well as a Hawker Siddeley 748 turboprop and a Britten-Norman Trislander prop aircraft were purchased and added to the fleet.

In 1982, the airline replaced its two BAC One-Eleven jets with Boeing 727-200 aircraft strengthening the airline's regional and international capability and also allowed for the introduction of first-class service. Cayman Airways also operated a single Douglas DC-8-52 and a leased Boeing 727-100 during the 1980s. These aircraft were eventually replaced with Boeing 737-200 jets which in turn were then subsequently replaced with Boeing 737-300 aircraft. Boeing 737-400 jetliners were previously operated as well. During the 1980s, Cayman Airways offered scheduled or charter service to Atlanta, Baltimore, Boston, Chicago, Detroit, Houston, Minneapolis, Newark, New York City, Philadelphia and St. Louis as well as Kingston and Montego Bay in Jamaica. In addition, Panama City, Panama was served at one point. The airline also flew between Miami and Grand Turk Island as well as Providenciales in the Turks & Caicos Islands. These were the only routes flown by the carrier that did not directly serve the Cayman Islands. Cayman Airways has also operated jet service into Cayman Brac with Boeing 727-200, Boeing 737-200 and Boeing 737-400 aircraft, including nonstop flights between Cayman Brac and Miami.

Struggles: 1990s
Throughout the early 1990s, the airline struggled. According to the Official Airline Guide (OAG), in 1991 three other air carriers including American Airlines, Northwest Airlines and Pan Am were competing with Cayman Airways on the Grand Cayman - Miami route with a combined total of 41 nonstop jet flights a week being operated by the four airlines. Financial assistance from the Cayman Islands Government as well as financial re-structuring plus newer, more modern aircraft and the addition of new destinations such as Chicago, Dallas/Fort Worth and Havana were beneficial for the airline at the time.

Recent history: 2000s

In 2005, Cayman Airways was the only airline operating nonstop service from Grand Cayman to Chicago O'Hare Airport (ORD) with a weekly 737 flight.

In 2016, it was announced that four new Boeing 737 MAX 8 aircraft would be introduced between late 2018 and 2020 thus allowing for the eventual retirement of the Boeing 737-300 aircraft currently operated by the airline. The airline has also added one Boeing 737-800 as an interim measure as a "bridge" aircraft between the B737-300 and the new B737 MAX 8. Cayman Airways Express also introduced Saab 340B regional turboprop aircraft between 2015 and 2016 in tandem with the eventual planned phased retirement of the DHC-6 Twin Otter series 300 aircraft as a part of the overall Cayman Airways fleet modernization plan.

On Wednesday 8 November 2017, the retirement process of the Boeing 737-300 began with the first aircraft being phased out.

On Monday 27 August 2018, Cayman Airways announced in a press conference that the airline was adding Denver, Colorado (DEN) to its list of gateways. Cayman Airways also stated that this flight will be the longest scheduled commercial flight the airline has ever operated. Cayman Airways was planning to  operate these seasonal five-hour nonstop flights from Grand Cayman to Denver twice weekly starting 2 March 2019, until August and then resume service in December 2019. The airline stated it would be operating its new Boeing 737 MAX 8 on this service.

During the press conference on 27 August 2018, it was also mentioned that other destinations are also being considered. Destinations such as Los Angeles, San Francisco, and Vancouver, B.C. may be served in the future with the new Boeing 737 MAX 8 with other possible destinations under consideration including London, England (via a stop in Bermuda) and Brazil. 
However, these new services would require the runway at Owen Roberts International Airport to be lengthened. This runway lengthening project is expected to occur within the next several years.

In October 2018 the first of the airlines Boeing 737 MAX 8 aircraft was on the final assembly line at the Boeing Renton Factory in Renton, Washington. The second Boeing 737 MAX 8 aircraft for the airline was on the assembly line at Boeing Renton Factory late January early February.

On 8 November 2018 the first of the airline's new Boeing 737 MAX 8 aircraft accomplished its first major test flight.

Shortly after the first test flight of the airline's first Boeing 737 MAX 8, Cayman Airways issued a statement about the safety of the new aircraft and its acceptance into the airline after concerns loomed due to a crash of an aircraft of the same model operated by Lion Air in Asia (Lion Air Flight 610). In the airline statement, Cayman Airways CEO and president Fabian Whorms stated "I can give a full assurance that our new aircraft will not be delivered or accepted unless it has thoroughly passed all required post-production flight and ground tests successfully. Cayman Airways operates within the strict parameters of a comprehensive and robust Safety Management System and our new Boeing 737 MAX 8 aircraft will enter passenger service only after both the aircraft and the Airline are in full compliance with all safety-related requirements.  Once the new aircraft enters service, it will be operated and maintained to the highest standards, with our usual and unwavering commitment to safety."

In mid-November, the airline's first Boeing 737 MAX 8 was painted in the company's colors. Further test flights took place after the aircraft had its paint job. By the end of November, the aircraft had completed all of the required post-production tests and ready for delivery. The first aircraft was handed over to the airline on 29 November 2018 and delivered to Cayman Airways at Owen Roberts International Airport in Grand Cayman, Cayman Islands on 30 November 2018. The second Boeing 737 MAX 8 aircraft, completed all it required test flights and had its paint job at the beginning of March, and its handover to airline and delivery flight to Cayman Airways at Owen Roberts International Airport on 6 and 7 March. The third Boeing 737 MAX 8 aircraft is expected to be produced and delivered by September 2019. The last of the four Boeing 737 MAX 8 that was ordered by the airline is expected to be delivered in September 2020.

On 2 March 2019 started with its inaugural Service to Denver, Colorado. This new service (flight number KX 442) was operated with the airline's new Boeing 737 MAX 8.

On 10 March 2019, Cayman Airways issued a statement about the temporary suspension of the new Boeing 737 MAX 8 aircraft after further concerns increased due to a second crash of the aircraft type operated by Ethiopian Airlines in Africa. In the airline statement Cayman Airways CEO Fabian Whorms stated: "We have taken the decision to suspend operations of both our new Boeing 737 Max 8 aircraft, effective from Monday 11 March 2019, until more information is received." Mr. Whorms also stated, "Cayman Airways is currently working in coordination with both the Boeing Corporation and the Civil Aviation Authority of the Cayman Islands (CAACI) to monitor the investigation into Ethiopian Airlines Flight 302."

In Late January 2021, The Civil Aviation Authority of the Cayman Islands (CAACI) rescinded its airspace restriction for the Boeing 737 MAX 8 aircraft. This action was done following clearance by the US Federal Aviation Administration (FAA) at the end of 2020 and approval in January 2021 by the UK Civil Aviation Authority (UK CAA) and the European Union Aviation Safety Agency (EASA). Officials explained that the decision follows the approval of extensive modifications to the design of the aircraft, to how it is flown, and to pilot training. This includes modifications to the aircraft’s Maneuvering Characteristics Augmentation System (MCAS), as well as other key safety changes aimed at preventing further accidents.

On 10 February 2021, a press conference with Cayman Airways CEO and other key personnel announced the ungrounding of its own Boeing 737 MAX 8 aircraft and a “Return To Service (RTS)” plan to reestablish the aircraft back into service. The press conference gave a solid assurance that the aircraft is ready to safely return to the skies from the fact that all of the world’s major aviation regulators and certifying authorities have given the aircraft a level of scrutiny that is unprecedented in aviation history. Cayman Airways has already completed all the aircraft modifications and improvements necessary to assure safe operation of the aircraft and we are now in the process of implementing several final measures, many of which are above and beyond the prescribed requirements. The Boeing 737 MAX 8 aircraft for the airline is expected to be fully operational beginning in Mid February.

In Early February 2021, the Cayman Islands Pilots Association (CAPA) issued a statement regarding the reentry of the Boeing 737 MAX 8 aircraft. CAPA stating "The B737-8 is one of the safest planes to fly on".

During the week of the 10 February Cayman Airways Press Conference, Cayman Airways announce public viewing and walkthrough of the newly upgraded Boeing 737 MAX 8 aircraft and watch some of the operational test flights at Owen Roberts International Airport and Charles Kirkconnell International Airport over the weekend.

Between 1st half 2020 to 2nd half of 2021 Cayman Airways like many airlines around the world had taken a hit due to the COVID19 Pandemic. However, from Mid 2020 through 3rd Quarter of 2021 Cayman Airways operated Repatriation flights through the Government's Travel Cayman Program. Cayman Airways returned to a reduced commercial flight schedule during the 4th Quarter of 2021.

On October 21, 2021, Cayman Airways cancelled its service to La Ceiba, Honduras due to an issuance of a NOTAM that Goloson International Airport is downgrading to a Category 6 Airport. Cayman Airways had operated the Boeing 737 MAX 8 for that route. ICAO requires airports to be Category 7 or higher for the Boeing 737 MAX 8 to operate.

In March 2023, during an interview on Cayman Compass talk show 'The Resh Hour', Cayman Airways CEO Fabian Whorms noted that they have begun the process of looking for a 3rd Twin Otter for its Express Fleet. He also noted that in the near future they may look at replacing its Saab 340B+ fleet, he also stated “Ideally, we’d like that whatever we replace it with be something that can also fulfil the mission that the Twin Otters currently fulfil for us. But that’s dependent as to what happens with the Little Cayman aerodrome.”

Destinations

Cayman Airways currently serves twelve destinations.  These destinations are located in the Cayman Islands, United States, Jamaica, Cuba and Honduras.

Fleet

Current fleet

The Cayman Airways fleet consists of the following aircraft : Cayman Airways also operates one Convair CV-580 twin prop aircraft, as a cargo flight operating flight number as (KX2909) from Miami to Grand Cayman. However, the plane isn't listed as normal passenger fleet of aircraft.

Historical fleet

The Former Cayman Airways fleet consists of the following aircraft (as of October 2021):

Logo
The company's mascot is an embellishment of the original Sir Turtle designed by Suzy Soto. As first designed, Sir Turtle did not have the red flying scarf. That original design was used on baggage stickers by Cayman Islands Customs and also became the logo of the Department of Tourism which was then headed by Eric Bergstrom. The red flying scarf was later added to Sir Turtle in 1978 by Capt. Wilbur Thompson, the Chief Pilot of Cayman Airways at the time, and the modified Sir Turtle became the airline's new logo.

Head office
Cayman Airways corporate office is located in George Town and is located at 91 Owen Roberts Drive almost opposite the Cayman Airways aircraft maintenance facility located at 54 Owen Roberts Drive. Owen Roberts Drive is the main road leading to the Owen Roberts International Airport in Grand Cayman.

The Cayman Airways corporate office was housed in the former Sammy's Airport Inn. Another previous Cayman Airways offices were damaged by Hurricane Ivan in 2004. The Cayman Islands government purchased Sammy's Airport Inn for $2.85 million United States dollars. The fit-out, including the furniture, was completed for $3 million U.S. with the valuation of the property estimated at 6.76 million U.S. as of June 2007. Parking for the head office is located in the adjacent Cayman Islands Airport Authority property with there being more parking per square foot at the current Cayman Airways head office than in most buildings in George Town.

References

External links
 

Cayman Airways

1968 establishments in the Cayman Islands
Airlines established in 1968
Airlines of the Cayman Islands
Latin American and Caribbean Air Transport Association